"Shockwave" is a song by English singer and songwriter Liam Gallagher. It was released as the lead single for Gallagher's second solo studio album, Why Me? Why Not. (2019). Gallagher co-wrote the song with Andrew Wyatt and producer Greg Kurstin. Kurstin also produced the single.

"Shockwave" was released on 5 June 2019, and entered the UK Singles Chart at #22, being his best charting single since "Wall of Glass". It also became his first solo #1 single, hitting the top spot in Scotland.

Music video
The music video to "Shockwave" was uploaded onto Gallagher's YouTube channel on 13 June 2019.
 
The video, directed by François Rousselet is mostly set in America’s Deep South, though much of it was actually filmed in Budapest.
Scenes show Gallagher walking away from a burning building, standing in a train carriage and walking through a crowd of protesters, some of whom are holding signs with the song's lyrics on them as well as the name of the album the song comes from - "Why Me? Why Not".

Charts

References

2019 singles
2019 songs
Liam Gallagher songs
Songs written by Liam Gallagher
Songs written by Greg Kurstin
Songs written by Andrew Wyatt
Song recordings produced by Greg Kurstin